Jean-Noël Hamal (Liège, 23 December 1709 - 26 November 1778) was a Walloon composer and director of music at Saint-Lambert Cathedral.

References

1709 births
1778 deaths